Hoda's (sometimes Hoda's Lebanese Restaurant, Hoda's Middle Eastern Cuisine, or Hoda's Middle Eastern Restaurant) is a restaurant in Portland, Oregon.

Description
Hoda's is a family-owned Lebanese restaurant and catering service on Belmont Street in southeast Portland's Sunnyside neighborhood. The menu includes shawarma, pizzas, spinach pies, breads, baba ghanoush, and hummus.

History

The business is owned by spouses Hani and Hoda Khouri, who opened the original restaurant in 1999. The Khouris, who are Catholic, received "several menacing anti-Muslim/Arab" phone calls at the restaurant following the September 11 attacks (2001).

In 2010, Hoda's filed a liquor license application and secured a location for a second restaurant in northeast Portland. The second restaurant, called Hoda's Middle Eastern Cuisine, opened in early 2011 and closed in 2014.

In 2020, during the COVID-19 pandemic, Hoda's served family meals via takeout and delivery while the dining room was closed; the menu included Kabob dinners, sandwiches, and lamb legs. Hoda Khouri also supported closing Belmont to allow more outdoor seating during the pandemic.

Reception
In 2015, Eater Portland Danielle Centoni called Hoda's one of the city's best Lebanese restaurants.

See also
 List of Lebanese restaurants
 List of Middle Eastern restaurants

References

External links

 
 

1999 establishments in Oregon
Asian restaurants in Portland, Oregon
Lebanese restaurants
Lebanese-American culture in Oregon
Middle Eastern restaurants in the United States
Middle Eastern-American culture in Portland, Oregon
Restaurants established in 1999
Sunnyside, Portland, Oregon